Novaya Samarka (Yañı Hamar) is a rural locality (a village) in Ziriklinsky Selsoviet, Bizhbulyaksky District, Bashkortostan, Russia. The population was six as of 2010. There is one street.

Geography 
Novaya Samarka is located 17 km southwest of Bizhbulyak (the district's administrative centre) by road. Zirikly is the nearest rural locality.

References 

Rural localities in Bizhbulyaksky District